Leslie Alexander Mutch (14 January 1897 – 2 January 1977) was a Liberal Party member of the House of Commons of Canada. He was born in Crystal City, Manitoba. His career included jobs as an advertising executive for Eaton's, a life insurance agent and a teacher.

Mutch graduated from the University of Manitoba in 1921 with a Bachelor of Arts and earned a Master of Arts degree there as well in 1929. He entered military service for World War I under the Queen's Own Cameron Highlanders, leaving the military in August 1945.

He was first elected to Parliament at the Winnipeg South riding in the 1935 general election then re-elected in 1940, 1945 and 1949, thus serving in the 18th, 19th, 20th, and 21st Canadian Parliaments in their entireties. He never sat in cabinet, but he did sit with the governing caucus, led by William Lyon Mackenzie King and, from 1948, Louis St. Laurent, throughout his political career. He did not seek re-election in 1953.

References

External links
 

1897 births
1977 deaths
Canadian military personnel of World War I
Canadian schoolteachers
Members of the House of Commons of Canada from Manitoba
Liberal Party of Canada MPs